John Barry Stewart (born 28 March 1937) is an English former professional footballer who played as a winger in the Football League for York City, in non-League football for Whitby Town, and was on the books of Darlington without making a league appearance.

References

1937 births
Living people
Footballers from Middlesbrough
English footballers
Association football forwards
Whitby Town F.C. players
York City F.C. players
Darlington F.C. players
English Football League players